The Men's scratch race at the 2014 Commonwealth Games, as part of the cycling programme, took place on 27 July 2014.

Results

Qualification
Heat 1

Heat 2

Finals

References

Men's scratch race
Cycling at the Commonwealth Games – Men's scratch